Takashi "Taka" Hidai (born ) is a Japanese wheelchair curler.

He participated in the 2010 Winter Paralympics where the two Japanese teams finished in tenth and fifth places. He participated in the Paralympics at the age of 75, the oldest athlete at that Paralympic tournament.

Teams

References

External links 

Profile at the Official Website for the 2010 Winter Paralympics in Vancouver
Vancouver Sun: 2010-03-18 - The 60-year gap. Games' oldest and youngest athletes share a zest for life. - PressReader

Living people
1934 births
Japanese male curlers
Japanese wheelchair curlers
Paralympic wheelchair curlers of Japan
Wheelchair curlers at the 2010 Winter Paralympics